Calytrix sagei is a species of plant in the myrtle family Myrtaceae that is endemic to Western Australia.

Found in a small area in the southern Wheatbelt region of Western Australia between Pingelly, Brookton and Beverley where it grows on sandy soils.

References

Plants described in 2013
sagei
Flora of Western Australia
Taxa named by Barbara Lynette Rye